Banjo Frogs is a 1998 Australian claymation film directed by Nick Hilligos.

Synopsis 
According to the New York Public Library catalogue's listing of the film:
"An unsuspecting, adolescent frog takes a trip to the garbage dump, where he tries unsensitively to ingratiate himself with the locals. But he just doesn't fit in until he picks up an old banjo and dramatically changes his tune."

Production 
According to Hilligoss, the concept for Banjo Frog came to him during a walk next to a creek near his Melbourne home when he noted the contrast between the beautiful green tree-frog's poor singing ability and the ugly banjo frog's better ability.

Hilligoss did most of the animation in Banjo Frogs by himself, except for a crowd scene in which he used an assistant.

Accolades 
ALA Notable Children's Video
Best Overall Program, 9-12 Youth Jury, ReaL to ReeL
Bronze Plaque, Columbus International Film & Video Festival
Certificate of Merit/Children's Jury, Chicago International Children's Film Festival

References

External links
 

Australian animated short films
1990 films
1990s English-language films
1990s Australian films